Valambur  is a town in Malappuram district in the state of Kerala, India.

Demographics
 India census, Valambur had a population of 24841 with 12029 males and 12812 females.

Transportation
Valambur town connects to other parts of India through Perinthalmanna town.  National highway No.66 passes through Tirur and the northern stretch connects to Goa and Mumbai.  The southern stretch connects to Cochin and Trivandrum.   Highway No.966 goes to Palakkad and Coimbatore.   The nearest airport is at Kozhikode.  The nearest major railway station is at Tirur.

References

   Cities and towns in Malappuram district
Perinthalmanna area